Chromium(II) acetylacetonate is the coordination compound with the formula Cr(O2C5H7)2. It is the homoleptic acetylacetonate complex of chromium(II). It is an air-sensitive, paramagnetic yellow brown solid. According to X-ray crystallography, the Cr center is square planar.  In contrast to the triplet ground state for this complex, the bis(pyridine) adduct features noninnocent acac2- ligand attached to Cr(III).

See also
 Chromium(III) acetylacetonate

References

Acetylacetonate complexes
Chromium complexes
Chromium–oxygen compounds
Chromium(II) compounds